Eric Thomas Skeels (born 27 October 1939) is an English former footballer. He played 512 games in the Football League, 507 for Stoke City. He is Stoke's record appearance holder having played in 597 matches in all competitions.

Skeels joined Stoke City in 1959 and soon established himself as an indispensable member of Tony Waddington's starting eleven. He was able to play in all outfield positions and became known for his consistency and racked up a club record 597 appearances. During his 17-year spell at the Victoria Ground he helped Stoke to win the Second Division in 1962–63, finish as runner-up of the League Cup in 1964, before winning the competition in 1972 he also helped them to reach the semi-final of the FA Cup in 1970–71 and 1971–72. He left for American side Seattle Sounders in 1976 before spending a short spell back in Stoke-on-Trent with Port Vale. He then became a pub landlord and played occasionally for Leek Town.

Career

Stoke City
Skeels was born in Eccles, Lancashire and played with in the youth side of local club Stockport County. Playing as an inside-forward for County's Central League side he attracted the attentions of Birmingham City. He was offered a contract by Birmingham manager Arthur Turner, but Turner then left and Skeels was unable to sign the contract. The scout who had recommend him to Turner, Reg Savage, prompted Skeels to attend trials at Stoke City. He did well enough and signed a professional contract in November 1958. When Tony Waddington took over in August 1960 he converted Skeels into a fine-tackling half-back who thrived on the 'ugly side' of the game.

From September 1960 he missed just eleven matches in seven seasons, establishing a reputation for his consistency and became known as 'Mr Dependable'. During his career at the Victoria Ground he played in every outfield position, filling in as and when required. In his natural position he was a defensive midfielder, although he made most of his appearances in the back four. Never a flashy player, he won a Second Division winner's medal in 1962–63 and a League Cup runners-up medal in 1964. Against Leicester City in August 1971, Skeels broke his leg in a tackle with Steve Whitworth. He battled his way back to fitness in time to replace the injured Denis Smith for the League Cup semi-final against West Ham United, helping Stoke to reach the 1972 League Cup Final, where they beat Chelsea 2–1. Skeels established a club record for league appearances towards the end of the 1974–75 season, and with war-time fixtures considered unofficial he also lays claim to record appearance holder in all competitions with 597. He had already been awarded a joint-testimonial match with Tony Allen against Derby County in February 1969 when he was given a free transfer by Stoke in June 1976.

Later career
He joined up with former teammate Geoff Hurst in the North American Soccer League with the Seattle Sounders, before signing for Roy Sproson's Port Vale in September 1976. He played five Third Division matches for the "Valiants" in the 1976–77 season, scoring once against Walsall. He then became the owner of the Hare and Hound pub in Glossop whilst making the occasional appearance for Leek Town. He returned to the Potteries to keep the Noah's Ark in Newcastle-under-Lyme and has also worked at Staffordshire University as a Porter.

Career statistics
Source:

Honours
Stoke City
Football League Second Division: 1962–63
League Cup: 1972; runner-up: 1964
Watney Cup: 1973

References

1939 births
Living people
People from Eccles, Greater Manchester
English footballers
Association football defenders
Cleveland Stokers players
Stockport County F.C. players
Stoke City F.C. players
Port Vale F.C. players
English expatriate footballers
Expatriate soccer players in the United States
Seattle Sounders (1974–1983) players
Leek Town F.C. players
English Football League players
North American Soccer League (1968–1984) players
United Soccer Association players
English expatriate sportspeople in the United States